Heimburg may refer to:

 the town Heimburg in Saxony-Anhalt, Germany.
 the Heimburg Castle  in Heimburg, Saxony-Anhalt, Germany.
 the castle Heimburg in Niederheimbach in Niederheimbach, Rhineland-Palatinate, Germany.